Pieri is an Italian surname. Notable people with the surname include:

Alessandro Pieri (born 1963), Italian sprint canoeist
Anna Pieri Brignole Sale (1765–1815), a Sienese noblewoman
Claudio Pieri (1940–2018), Italian football referee
Damon Pieri (born 1970), American football player
Dario Pieri (born 1975), Italian former road bicycle racer
Enrico Pieri (1934–2021), Italian child, survived a German massacre of Italian villagers during World War II
Francesco Pieri (1902–1961), Italian Roman Catholic bishop
Gianfranco Pieri (born 1937), retired Italian basketball player
Giovanni Antonio De Pieri, known as il Zoppo Vicentino (1671–1751), Italian painter of the Baroque style
Jessica Pieri (born 1997), Italian tennis player
Louis Pieri (1897–1967), American basketball and ice hockey executive and coach
Mario Pieri (1860–1913), Italian mathematician
Mirko Pieri (born 1978), Italian football manager and former player
Pieris Pieri (born 1996), Cypriot alpine ski racer
Valentina Pieri (born 2006), Fashion model award Princess of Cyprus 2020 

Italian-language surnames